Raymond Michael "Ray" Reid (born May 8, 1960 in Brentwood, New York) is a retired American college soccer coach. He was head coach at the University of Connecticut Huskies men's soccer team for 24 years. He has led UConn to one NCAA Division I national championship, eight Big East regular season championships and four Big East tournament championships. Before coming to UConn, he was the head coach at Southern Connecticut State University, leading the team to three NCAA Division II national championships in eight seasons. Reid leads all coaches in the nation in winning percentage (.769) and has won four NSCAA Coach of the Year awards.

Early years 
Reid was raised in Brentwood, New York. He graduated from Southern Connecticut in 1982 with a degree in economics.

Playing career 
Reid was a soccer standout at Brentwood High School, where he received academic honors in addition to those on the field. He spent his first year of NCAA eligibility at Suffolk Community College, receiving all-region honors. He transferred to Southern Connecticut for his remaining three years of eligibility. He was a captain on the team for his junior and senior years and played in three NCAA Division II national championship semifinals while with the Owls.

Early coaching years 
After graduating from Southern Connecticut in 1982, Reid was offered an assistant coaching position by then-head coach Bob Dikranian. He spent the next six seasons as an assistant coach at the school, helping the team win its first national championship in 1987.

Head coach at Southern Connecticut 
During Reid's eight-year tenure at Southern Connecticut, the Owls only missed the NCAA tournament once (1991) and advanced to the Division II College Cup six times (1990, 1992, 1993, 1994, 1995, 1996), winning national championships in three of those years (1990, 1993, 1995).

Head coach at Connecticut 
UConn initially pursued Reid for the coaching job after long-time head coach Joe Morrone suffered several sub-par seasons, failing to reach the NCAA tournament for seven straight years. After several years of turning down offers from other Division I programs, Reid decided to take the job, which some of those close to him described as "his dream job". He has coached at UConn since 1997, and has obtained a 248–80–46 (.725) mark during his 17 seasons in Storrs. In just his third season, Reid took the Huskies to the College Cup semifinals, falling just short of the national championship game. But Reid brought back a determined team in 2000, winning his first and only Division I national championship in a 2–0 victory against Creighton. His teams have made sixteen straight NCAA tournament appearances, including three straight national quarterfinal appearances since 2011.

Personal life 
Reid married Valarie Casares in 2008. Reid has two daughters, Cate and Dannielle, from his previous marriage to Sondra Reid.

Reid has worked closely with current UConn associate head coach John Deeley for more than 30 years, who played against Reid in high school and later with him at Southern Connecticut. The pair appeared in two NCAA Division II national championship semifinals while with the Owls. Upon Reid's promotion to head coach at Southern Connecticut in 1989, he hired Deeley as an assistant, where they worked together for eight years. Reid brought Deeley with him when he came to UConn in 1997.

Head coaching record

References

External links
UConnHuskies.com Men's Soccer Coaching Staff

1960 births
Living people
American soccer coaches
Association footballers not categorized by position
People from Brentwood, New York
Southern Connecticut Fighting Owls men's soccer players
UConn Huskies men's soccer coaches
Association football players not categorized by nationality